North Rich Township was a township in Anderson County, Kansas, United States. It was dissolved and merged into Rich Township in 2017. As of the 2016 American Community Survey, its population was estimated to be 90 people.  As of the 2010 census, its population was 107.

Geography

References
 USGS Geographic Names Information System (GNIS)

External links
 City-Data.com

Townships in Anderson County, Kansas
Townships in Kansas